Kat Coiro is an American filmmaker known for directing Marry Me, a romantic comedy starring Jennifer Lopez, Owen Wilson, and Malumaa box-office success for Universal Pictures in 2022. She directed and executive produced She-Hulk: Attorney at Law, co-executive produced and directed the pilot episodes of the television series Girls5Eva, Florida Girls, and many other television shows.

Early life 
Coiro was born in Manhattan to parents Peter Eves and Gina Cunningham-Eves, who are of English and Italian American descent. Her sister, Emmy Eves, later became a production designer and worked as an art director on Coiro's first movie, Life Happens. Her godmother, Katharine Kean, co-directed the 1992 documentary Haiti: Killing the Dream with Rudi Stern and starring Jean-Bertrand Aristide. The family moved to Miami Beach, Florida when Coiro was in elementary school to open up a Haitian restaurant called Tap Tap, above which the family lived in an upstairs apartment.

In ninth grade, Coiro enrolled in boarding school at Interlochen Arts Academy. She taught theater at the University of Miami summer arts camp and studied theater and Russian history at Carnegie Mellon University in Pittsburgh, and later studied directing at the Moscow Art Theatre in Russia before moving to Los Angeles to pursue filmmaking.

Career 
Coiro began her career writing, directing and producing micro-budget independent films, including her 2011 debut Life Happens with Krysten Ritter and 2013 festival favorite And While We Were Here, which she shot in Italy in 11 days for $150,000 while pregnant. She later transitioned into television, directing episodes of shows including Dead to Me, Modern Family, Shameless and It's Always Sunny in Philadelphia. She directed the pilot episodes of the television series Girls5Eva, Florida Girls, and She-Hulk: Attorney at Law, and directed and executive produced the majority of episodes for the latter series. Her film Marry Me, a romantic comedy starring Jennifer Lopez, Owen Wilson, and Maluma, was released to theaters and streaming in 2022 by Universal Pictures.

Personal life 
Coiro is married to actor Rhys Coiro, whom she directed in Life Happens and She-Hulk: Attorney at Law. They have three children.

Credits

Television

Films

References

External links 
 
 

Living people
20th-century American actresses
21st-century American actresses
21st-century American screenwriters
21st-century American women writers
Actresses from New York City
Carnegie Mellon University College of Fine Arts alumni
American film actresses
American film producers
American people of English descent
American people of Italian descent
American television actresses
American television directors
American women film directors
American women film producers
American women screenwriters
American women television directors
Film directors from New York City
Film producers from New York (state)
Screenwriters from New York (state)
Writers from Manhattan
Year of birth missing (living people)